Plantar ligament refer to ligaments in the sole of the foot:
 Plantar plates, fibrocartilaginous structures in the metatarsophalangeal and interphalangeal joints of the toes.
 One of several tarsal, metatarsal, and tarsometatarsal ligaments:
 Long plantar ligament, that connects the calcaneus with the cuboid bone
 Plantar calcaneocuboid ligament, deep to previous
 Plantar calcaneonavicular ligament, that connects the calcaneus with the navicular bone
 Plantar cuneonavicular ligaments, that connect the navicular bone with adjacent cuneiform bones
 Plantar intercuneiform ligaments, between the cuneiform bones
 Plantar cuboideonavicular ligament, that connects the cuboid with the navicular bone
 Plantar cuneocuboid ligament, that connects the cuboid with the cuneiform bones

See also 
 Palmar ligament (disambiguation)